Johnny "Jack" McGuire (March 3, 1893 in Dunblane, Scotland – November 18, 1962 in Brooklyn, New York) was a Scottish-U.S. soccer inside right who played professionally in both Scotland, Canada and the United States.  He also earned one cap with the U.S. national team.  He is a member of the National Soccer Hall of Fame.

Professional
McGuire spent time with Scottish clubs Dundee F.C. and St Johnstone F.C. before moving to Canada in 1919 to play two season with Toronto Ulster United. In 1921, he moved to the U.S. club Robins Dry Dock of the National Association Football League (NAFBL).  That year, Robins won the U.S. 1921 National Challenge Cup 4-2 over J&P Coats with McGuire scoring two of Robins four goals.  In 1921, the American Soccer League replaced the NAFBL and Robins entered the new league as Todd Shipyards.  Robins Dry Dock was part of the larger Todd Shipyard.  Todd Shipyards lasted only one season before folding and McGuire moved to Paterson F.C.  However, before folding, Todd went to the 1922 National Challenge Cup final where it fell, 3-2 to St. Louis Scullin Steel.  McGuire again scored two goals.  McGuire once again spent only one year with his new club, Paterson.  However, in 1923, he went to his third consecutive Challenge Cup, winning it again this year.  McGuire then moved to the New Bedford Whalers for the 1924-1925 season before closing out his career with Brooklyn Wanderers in 1925-1926.

National team
McGuire earned one cap with the U.S. national team in a 6-1 win over Canada on November 8, 1925.

He was inducted into the National Soccer Hall of Fame in 1951.

See also
List of United States men's international soccer players born outside the United States

References

External links
 National Soccer Hall of Fame profile

1893 births
1962 deaths
Dundee F.C. players
St Johnstone F.C. players
United States men's international soccer players
Toronto Ulster United players
National Association Football League players
Robins Dry Dock players
American Soccer League (1921–1933) players
Todd Shipyards (soccer team) players
Paterson F.C. (NAFBL) players
British emigrants to the United States
New York Field Club players
New Bedford Whalers players
Brooklyn Wanderers players
National Soccer Hall of Fame members
People from Dunblane
Footballers from Stirling (council area)
Association football inside forwards
Canadian National Soccer League players
American soccer players